Chukuemeke Egbule (born October 13, 1996) is an American football linebacker for the Pittsburgh Steelers of the National Football League (NFL). He played college football at Houston.

Early years
Emeke Egbule attended North Shore Senior High School. He played both football and basketball for his school. He was named to the 2013 district 21-5A all-district first-team as a tight end.

College career
Egbule played four years of college football at the University of Houston as a linebacker. He finished his four years with a total of 162 tackles.

Professional career

Los Angeles Chargers
Egbule was selected by the Los Angeles Chargers in the sixth round (200th overall) of the 2019 NFL Draft.

On August 31, 2021, Egbule was waived by the Chargers and re-signed to the practice squad the next day. He signed a reserve/future contract with the Chargers on January 11, 2022.

On August 30, 2022, Egbule was waived by the Chargers.

Pittsburgh Steelers
On December 7, 2022, Egbule was signed to the Pittsburgh Steelers practice squad. He signed a reserve/future contract on January 10, 2023.

References

External links
Houston bio

1996 births
Living people
Players of American football from Texas
Sportspeople from Harris County, Texas
American football linebackers
Houston Cougars football players
Los Angeles Chargers players
Pittsburgh Steelers players